Jack Greene, Jeannie Seely is a studio album by American country music artists Jack Greene and Jeannie Seely. It was released in January 1970 on Decca Records. The album was produced by Owen Bradley and Harry Silverstein. The album included the duo's first major hit single together, "Wish I Didn't Have to Miss You". Their self-titled studio album reached peak positions on the Billboard country albums chart upon its initial release.

Background and content
The pair's eponymous album was recorded in several sessions held at Bradley's Barn between July and November 1969. Owen Bradley produced eight of the album's tracks, while Harry Silverstein produced the remaining three tracks. Altogether, the record contained 11 tracks. Some of the album's included cover versions of songs previously recorded by other artists. The opening track, "Love Is No Excuse", was a duet recording originally by Jim Reeves and Dottie West. The second track, "Yearning", was first cut by Jeannette Hicks and George Jones. The album was Greene and Seely's first album together. As a duet team, they would release another album and two more singles during the early 1970s.

Release and chart performance
Jack Greene, Jeannie Seely was released in January 1970 on Decca Records. The album was issued as a vinyl record, with six songs on the first side and five songs the opposite side. In March 1970, the album reached a peak of 18 on the Billboard Top Country Albums survey. The album's only single was the track "Wish I Didn't Have to Miss You". The song became a major hit by early 1970, reaching number 2 on the Billboard Hot Country Singles chart. In addition, the single reached number 21 on the Canadian RPM Country Singles chart.

Track listing

Personnel
All credits are adapted from the liner notes of Jack Greene, Jeannie Seely.

 Owen Bradley – producer (side 1: tracks 1, 2, 6) (side 2: tracks 3-5)
 Jack Greene – lead vocals
 Jeannie Seely – lead vocals
 Ernest Tubb – liner notes
 Harry Silverstein – producer (side 1: tracks 3-5) (side 2: tracks 1-2)

Chart performance

Release history

References

1970 albums
Albums produced by Owen Bradley
Decca Records albums
Jack Greene albums
Jeannie Seely albums
Vocal duet albums